Maria Kwiatkowsky (April 23, 1985 – July 4, 2011) was a German film, stage, and television actress. She is best known for her leading role in the film by Ayşe Polat  (2004).

Maria Kwiatkowsky died on July 4, 2011, during filming, at the age of 26 in her Berlin apartment from a cocaine overdose.

Selected filmography

References

External links

1985 births

2011 deaths
21st-century German actresses
Actresses from Berlin
German film actresses
German television actresses
German stage actresses
Audiobook narrators
Drug-related deaths in Germany
Cocaine-related deaths